Cladodus is an extinct genus of cartilaginous fishes in the family Cladoselachidae. As the name implies, they are a type of cladodont, primitive sharks with teeth designed to snag fish and swallow them whole, instead of sawing off chunks to swallow.

Fossils of Cladodus have been found in Barkip, Scotland and in the Pitkin Formation (Carboniferous period) in Arkansas, United States. In addition, fossils attributable to Cladodus are known from the Manning Canyon Shale of Carboniferous age in the state of Utah.

Species 
†Cladodus alternatus St. John & Worthen, 1875 
†Cladodus angulatus Newberry & Worthen, 1866 
†Cladodus bellifer St. John & Worthen, 1875 
†Cladodus divaricatus Trautschold, 1874 
†Cladodus elegans Newberry & Worthen, 1870  Remains (braincase and a tooth) have been found in Scotland (Clackmannan Group).
†Cladodus eriensis Bryant, 1935 
†Cladodus formosus Hay, 1902 
†Cladodus gailensis Feichtinger et al., 2021 
†Cladodus marginatus Agassiz, 1843 
†Cladodus mirabilis Agassiz, 1843 (type species)
†Cladodus pandatus St. John & Worthen, 1875 
†Cladodus springeri St. John & Worthen, 1875 
†Cladodus vanhornei St. John & Worthen, 1875 
†Cladodus yunnanensis Pan, 1964

See also 
 List of prehistoric cartilaginous fish genera

References 

Prehistoric cartilaginous fish genera
Mississippian fish of North America
Elasmobranchii
Taxa named by Louis Agassiz
Fossil taxa described in 1843
Carboniferous fish of Europe
Fossils of Austria